Cansahcab is a town and the municipal seat of the Cansahcab Municipality, Yucatán in Mexico.

References

Populated places in Yucatán